The University of Peloponnese (UoP) is a Greek tertiary educational institution, composed of campuses in Tripoli, Corinth, Kalamata, Nafplio, Sparta, and Patras with 24,000 students in 9 schools across the campuses, with the former being in turn composed of 22 departments.

History
UoP was established as a public university system with the presidential decree 13/2000.

The Tripoli campus was the first to open, on 20 September 2002 with the beginning of classes of the Department of Computer Science and Technology and the Department of Telecommunication Science and Technology, both part of the School of Science and Technology.

By Law 4610/2019 the Technological Educational Institute of Western Greece was abolished and its School of Engineering was absorbed by the University of Peloponnese, and the Technological Educational Institute of Peloponnese was also absorbed by the University of Peloponnese.

The Rectorate of the university is near the city center, once home to the poet Kostas Karyotakis. Its flagship campus is in Tripoli and is being developed at the level of complete schools across the six capitals of the Prefectures of the Region of Peloponnese.

Emblem
The emblem of the University of Peloponnese is Pelops.

Mission 
The website of the University of the Peloponnese provides the following description of its mission:

 Generating, disseminating and promoting scientific knowledge through teaching, research and the contribution to the cultural and economic development of the local community and wider society.
 Strengthening interdisciplinary cooperation and synergies among Departments within the university and with other institutions in Greece and abroad.
 Expansion and qualitative upgrading of all academic programs at all levels.
 Closer cooperation with local and regional authorities.
 Strengthening links with alumni and external stakeholders.
 Internationalization of research and teaching.
 Effective administrative structures and practices.
 Integration of information and communication technologies.

Schools and departments
The University of Peloponnese is divided into 9 schools, which are further divided into 22 departments (Greek: Τμήματα).

Postgraduate programs
24 Postgraduate programs (6 in English and 8 in collaboration with Greek and foreign universities)

 Ancient and Modern Greek Literature
 Byzantine World: Its Relation to Antiquity and Modern Hellenism
 Governance and Public Policies
 Space Science, Technologies and Applications
 Global Challenges and Systems of Analysis
 Local and Regional Development and Local Government
 Dramatic Art and Performing Arts in Education and Lifelong Learning
 Theater and Society: Theory, Stage Act and Didactics
 Data Science (in collaboration with the National Center for Research on Natural Sciences Democritus)
 Computer Science
 Modern Wireless Communications
 Accounting and finance
 Management and Financial Planning for Public and Private Managers
 Mediterranean Studies (joint postgraduate diploma from the Department of Political Science and International Relations of the University of Peloponnese and the Department of Economic and Financial Science of the Neapolis University Paphos, Cyprus)
 Organization and Management of Athletic Activities for People with Disabilities
 Organization and Administration of Public Services, Public Organizations and Enterprises
 Olympic Studies, Olympic Education, Organization and Management of Olympic Events
 Ethics and Integrity in Sports (under the Erasmus Mundus program in collaboration with Swansea University (United Kingdom), KU Leuven (Belgium), Pompeu Fabra University (Spain), Charles University (Czech Republic), University of Johannesburg (Germany)
 Management of Sports Organizations and Business
 Cultural Heritage Materials and Technologies (in collaboration with NCSR Democritus and the National Observatory of Athens)
 Modern History: New Visions and Perspectives
 Educational Policy: Design, Development and Management
 Social Politics
 Higher Education Policy: Theory and Practice (in collaboration with the Department of Primary Education of the University of Patras, Department of Primary Education of the University of the Aegean)

Research 
About 160 competitive research projects are in progress (participation in 7 H2020 & 20 Erasmus+).

 70 internationally funded projects
 85 nationally funded projects

Outward orientation 

 Collaboration with 8 national and 13 foreign Universities
 Collaboration with 30 national and 3 international organizations (Ministries, Regions, Municipalities, Chambers, Institutes, Research centres, Charity organizations, etc.)

Social contribution via:

 The collaboration with the Region of Peloponnese
 Staff, students and alumni involvement in a wide range of activities

Erasmus+ and UoP 
250 Interinstitutional Agreements in 26 countries

Students’ Mobility

 306 students have studied and 221 have trained abroad
 171 students have studied and 99 have trained in Greece

Teaching Staff Mobility

 103 members of teaching staff have gained new teaching experiences in an international context and 119 came to the University of the Peloponnese

Administrative Staff Mobility

 89 members of administrative staff have undertaken learning and/or professional experience in another countries and 66 came to the University of the Peloponnese.

Academic evaluation 
In 2016 the external evaluation committee gave University of the Peloponnese a Positive evaluation.

An external evaluation of all academic departments in Greek universities was conducted by the Hellenic Quality Assurance and Accreditation Agency (HQAA).

Modern Greek classes
The university offers summer Greek classes in the Kalamata campus. The program is directed at Greeks living abroad, especially in the United States, Canada, Australia and the UK. For people of Greek descent who have at least one grandparent from the Messenia province, the classes are free as are room and food during the one-month program. The World Council of Messenians Abroad provides the funding for the scholarship program.

Erasmus programme
The University of the Peloponnese participates in LLP Erasmus Program (Studies and Placement). They welcome students from:
Member – states of the European Union 
States – members of the European Economic Area: ,

Student life
Modern, multidisciplinary,regional and multi-campus university

 Reunions – annual gathering of alumni held the weekend before graduation.
 Student elections

See also

 List of universities in Greece
 List of research institutes in Greece
 Education in Greece

References

External links
 University of the Peloponnese official website 
 University of the Peloponnese Internal Quality Assurance Unit  
 Hellenic Quality Assurance and Accreditation Agency (HQAA) 
 L.L.P. ERASMUS International and Public Relations Department - University of Peloponnese 
 University of Peloponnese DASTA Office (Career Office & Innovation Unit) 
 University of Peloponnese Special Account for Funds and Research  
 Greek Research & Technology Network (GRNET) 
 okeanos (GRNET's cloud service) 

Universities in Greece
Educational institutions established in 2002
Tripoli, Greece
Nafplion
Kalamata
Corinth
Buildings and structures in Peloponnese (region)
2002 establishments in Greece